“Saraya Aqaba” is a Jordanian private shareholding company, whose founding shareholders include Saraya Jordan, Jordan’s Social Security Corporation, Aqaba Development Corporation, and Arab Bank plc. Saraya Aqaba will implement the US$1 billion “Saraya Aqaba Project”, a tourism and leisure destination, with a mixed-use themed development. Situated on the northern tip of the Gulf of Aqaba, the construction of the Saraya Aqaba Project and its man-made lagoon will add approximately 1.5 km of beachfront to the city of Aqaba.

References

External links
Official site

Aqaba
Real estate companies of Jordan
Tourism in Jordan